Heltah Skeltah was an American hip hop duo which consisted of rappers Jahmal "Rock" Bush and Sean "Ruck" Price. The two were also members of New York supergroup Boot Camp Clik, along with Buckshot, Smif-N-Wessun and O.G.C.

Biography 
Heltah Skeltah debuted on Smif-N-Wessun's album Dah Shinin' in 1995, appearing on the tracks "Wontime", "Cession at da Doghillee" and "Let's Git It On". Later in 1995, they grouped up with fellow Boot Camp members O.G.C. to form the Fab 5 (a nod to the Beatles), and released a surprise hit single, "Leflaur Leflah Eshkoshka". Out of the Fab 5 members, Rock and Sean Price received the most attention for their charisma and chemistry. The duo released their debut album Nocturnal in June 1996, which included "Leflah", as well as the singles "Operation Lock Down" and "Therapy". The album sold over 250,000 copies in the United States, and has become a classic because of its grimy, basement sound and strong lyrics. The duo released a group album with the Boot Camp in 1997, then followed in 1998 with their second effort Magnum Force. The album's lead single, "I Ain't Havin' That" (sampled from the A Tribe Called Quest track "Hot Sex", with the chorus sampling Redman's 1996 hit "Pick it Up"), became a Hot 100 hit. Despite the single's success, the album was criticized due to its lighter content. Price and Rock seemed disillusioned with their lack of sales, and split up. Rock began having problems with Duck Down Records, and split with the label, signing to DJ Lethal's Lethal Records. He planned to release an album titled Planet Rock, but the label folded and the album disappeared. Sean Price remained with the Camp for their second album The Chosen Few in 2002. Heltah Skeltah reunited in 2005, making appearances on Sean Price's solo album Monkey Barz and Smif-N-Wessun's Smif 'N' Wessun: Reloaded. The duo continued work with the Boot Camp for their third group effort The Last Stand, released in July 2006. In 2007, Heltah Skeltah had a track included on the Official Joints mixtape, a collection of previously unreleased songs by NYC rappers. Heltah Skeltah dropped their third album together titled D.I.R.T. (Da Incredible Rap Team) which was released on September 30, 2008. Sean Price died in his sleep on August 8, 2015. He was 43 years old.

Rock had his own song called "I Am Rock", which was not used in any Heltah Skeltah albums and was prominently featured in EA video games which include NFL Street 2, Need for Speed: Most Wanted, Madden NFL Arcade, EA Sports UFC 2, and made an appearance in the "Legends" update of the 2015 Need for Speed remake.

Discography

Studio albums

Singles 
 1995: Leflaur Leflah Eshkoshka (featuring O.G.C.) / Letha Brainz Blo
 1996: Operation Lock Down / Da Wiggy
 1996: Therapy (featuring Vinia Mojica) / Place to Be
 1998: I Ain't Havin That (featuring Starang Wondah) / Worldwide (Rock the World)
 1998: Brownsville II Long Beach (featuring Tha Dogg Pound) / Gunz 'N Onez (Iz U Wit Me) (featuring Method Man)
 2008: Everything Is Helthah Skeltah (featuring The Loudmouf Choir)
 2008: Ruck n Roll

References

External links 
Official Site of Duckdown Records
Rock of Heltah Skeltah – official site
Sean Price of Heltah Skeltah – official site
Itshiphop.tv video interviews
Heltah Skeltah Interview: "We are not about soft rap"
Heltah Skeltah interview (ArtofRhyme.com)

African-American musical groups
American musical duos
Boot Camp Clik members
Hip hop duos
Hip hop groups from New York City
Musical groups from Brooklyn
Hardcore hip hop groups
People from Brownsville, Brooklyn
The Fab 5 members